Lake Fianga is a lake in Chad and Cameroon. It does not have clearly delineated borders, as it forms the western border of an area of permanent swampland. The lake forms with the seasonal flooding of the Logone River.

References

 
Fianga
Fianga
Cameroon–Chad border
Fianga